The Nova Scotia Student Advocacy Coalition (NSSAC) was a post-secondary education student lobby group in the Canadian province of Nova Scotia.  It collapsed in 2003 as a result of ideological differences between Canadian Federation of Students and Canadian Alliance of Student Associations schools within the coalition.

The member organizations of NSSAC were:
Acadia Students' Union
University College of Cape Breton Students' Union 
Dalhousie Student Union
St. Francis Xavier University Students' Union 
Saint Mary's University Students' Association
University of King's College Students' Union
Mount Saint Vincent University Students' Union
Student Union of Nova Scotia College of Art and Design
Association générale des étudiants de l'Université Sainte-Anne

See also
Alliance of Nova Scotia Student Associations
Canadian Federation of Students
Canadian Alliance of Student Associations

References 

Students' associations in Canada